Rubus alaskensis, the Alaska blackberry, is a North American species of flowering plant in the rose family. It is native to Alaska and to western Canada (Yukon, Northwest Territory, British Columbia).

The genetics of Rubus is extremely complex, so that it is difficult to decide on which groups should be recognized as species. There are many rare species with limited ranges such as this. Further study is suggested to clarify the taxonomy.

References

alaskensis
Plants described in 1941
Flora of Canada
Flora of Alaska